Qarzi Karji (also Romanized as Qārẕī Karjī; also known as Qārẕī, Qārzī, and Qārzī Bām) is a village in Bam Rural District, Bam and Safiabad District, Esfarayen County, North Khorasan Province, Iran. At the 2006 census, its population was 614, in 161 families.

References 

Populated places in Esfarayen County